{{Infobox boxing match
| fight date = April 12, 1997
| Fight Name = Pound for Pound
| location = Thomas & Mack Center, Paradise, Nevada, U.S.
| image = 
| fighter1 = Pernell Whitaker
| nickname1 = Sweet Pea
| record1 = 40–1–1 (17 KO)
| height1 = 5 ft 6 in
| weight1 = 146+1/2 lb
| style1 = Southpaw
| hometown1 = Norfolk, Virginia, U.S.
| recognition1 = WBC welterweight champion[[The Ring (magazine)|The Ring]] No. 2 ranked pound-for-pound fighter4-division world champion
| fighter2 =  Oscar De La Hoya
| nickname2 = The Golden Boy
| record2 = 23–0 (20 KO)
| hometown2 = East Los Angeles, California, U.S.
| height2 = 5 ft 10 in
| weight2 = 146+1/2 lb
| style2 = Orthodox
| recognition2 = WBC super lightweight championThe Ring No. 3 ranked pound-for-pound fighter3-division world champion
| titles = WBC welterweight title
|result=De La Hoya wins via 12-round unanimous decision (116-110, 116-110, 115-111)
}}

Pernell Whitaker vs. Oscar De La Hoya, billed as Pound for Pound'', was a professional boxing match contested on April 12, 1997 for the WBC welterweight championship.

Background
The bout featured a matchup of two of the top ranked pound-for-pound fighters in boxing. 33-year-old Pernell Whitaker had been the WBC welterweight champion for four years, captured world titles in four different divisions and had been among the top pound-for-pound fighters in the sport since 1989, with The Ring magazine listing him number one in their annual pound-for-pound rankings for three consecutive years from 1993 to 1995. The 24–year old Oscar De La Hoya was a perfect 23–0, had already become a three-division world champion and was reigning WBC super lightweight champion, which he had won the previous year after defeating Mexican legend Julio César Chávez. At the time of their fight, De La Hoya and Whitaker were the number two and three ranked pound-for-pound fighters, with only the then-WBC light heavyweight champion Roy Jones Jr. ahead of them.

Plans for the mega-fight had been discussed since De La Hoya's victory over Chávez. The bout was all but set in early 1997, though both De La Hoya and Whitaker would first have to get past their mandatory challengers. De La Hoya would make the first, and only, defense of his super lightweight title against the undefeated Miguel Ángel González, while Whitaker would meet Diosbelys Hurtado, who was also unbeaten, in a welterweight title match the following week De La Hoya would have little trouble with Gonzalez, scoring a lopsided unanimous decision victory and putting the pressure squarely on Whitaker. Whitaker, however, would have difficulty with Hurtado. Hurtado scored two knockdowns and was ahead on all three official scorecards when Whitaker rallied in the 11th round, scoring 10 unanswered left hooks to Hurtado's head before the referee stopped the fight and awarded Whitaker the technical knockout victory, officially putting the Whitaker–De La Hoya match on.

The Fight
In a very close fight,  De La Hoya was awarded the bout by unanimous decision with two scores of 116–110 and 115–111, however, most ringside observers & sportswriters felt that Whitaker won the fight. ) Whitaker outpunched De La Hoya, landing 232 punches to De La Hoya's 191 and dominated with his jab, scoring 160 while De La Hoya only landed 45. Whitaker also scored the fight's lone knockdown, as he caught De La Hoya off balance with a left hook late in the ninth round, De La Hoya quickly rose up as if he had slipped, but referee Mills Lane ruled it a knockdown. Though De La Hoya did not land as many punches or jabs as Whitaker, he had a  distinct advantage in power punches, landing 146 to Whitaker's 72, which may have swayed the judges in his favor. Whitaker did not agree with decision, stating that he "could not have performed better" and he felt the decision should have been a "blowout" in his favor.

Aftermath
Even before their match, Whitaker stated that, win or lose, he wanted a rematch with De La Hoya, and after his loss, he would repeat that sentiment. De La Hoya initially was in favor this, stating that he would give Whitaker a rematch "any time, any place." However, these plans were shot down by De La Hoya's promoter Bob Arum, who said that a rematch wouldn't be "good business."

Oscar De La Hoya would remain the WBC Welterweight champion for over two years, making seven successful title defenses, the most defenses De La Hoya would make in any of the eight weight classes he competed in. His reign came to an end on September 18, 1999 when he was defeated by Félix Trinidad via a controversial majority decision. 

Whitaker would return on October 17, 1997 to take on obscure Russian fighter Andrey Pestryayev, who was the number one ranked welterweight by the WBA in an "eliminator" bout to determine who would next face their welterweight champion Ike Quartey. Originally, Whitaker would win the fight by a close unanimous decision and a WBA title match with Quartey was set for April 25, 1998. However, the result was changed to a no contest when Whitaker tested positive for cocaine, costing him his victory and earning him a six-month suspension. The WBA lifted the ban in February and agreed to let Whitaker continue forward with his title match with Quartey, provided that Whitaker submit to random drug testing over a six-month period, to which Whitaker agreed. However, Whitaker would fail another drug test shortly after and his title match was cancelled. Whitaker would then enter a drug rehabilitation center and would not fight at all in 1998. He would finally return on February 20, 1999 to challenge Félix Trinidad for the IBF welterweight title. In what would be his final title match, Whitaker would lose by unanimous decision.

References

1997 in boxing
1997 in sports in Nevada
Boxing matches involving Oscar De La Hoya
Boxing in Las Vegas
Boxing on HBO
April 1997 sports events in the United States